Monkman Provincial Park is a provincial park in British Columbia, southwest of Tumbler Ridge and northeast of Hansard. Like Monkman Pass, Monkman Lake, Monkman Creek and Monkman Falls, it was named after Alexander Monkman.

History
By the early 1960s, a strong local interest emerged to create a national park, with a proposed name of Canada Centennial Park. Covering approximately a 100-mile long and 30-mile wide section of the Monkman area, a 1970 report proposed a freeze on further land leases for resources extraction, and the formation of a wilderness park. The Regional District of Fraser-Fort George opposed the plan because of its impact on resource development. In due course, the government banned all off-road vehicular access to prevent ground cover damage. Established in 1981, the park covers 62,867 hectares.

The washed out logging road, formerly accessible only by all-terrain vehicles and four-wheel-drive trucks with winches, was upgraded during 1991 to a gravel road suitable for regular vehicles. The grand opening occurred the following August, with a new 42-unit campground. The 75-passenger BC Rail Prince George-Tumbler Ridge-Chetwynd circle tour for the ceremony sold out within days. A further 22,000 hectares were added to the park in 1999 to protect the Limestone Lakes and Upper Fontiniko Creek Valley areas.

Features

Monkman Pass
The discovery is unclear, and railway officials and legislators ignored the pass’s value, but the combined efforts of hundreds of volunteers attempted to conquer it with a highway. Only a few sections of the former road/packhorse trail are visible along the Monkman Lake Trail and Monkman Pass Memorial Trail. For the history of the wider Monkman Pass area see:

Kinuseo Falls
Located 2 km. north of the campground at the northern tip of the park, the 60-metre (197-foot) waterfall is slightly taller than Niagara Falls, but with a fraction of the water.

The Green Bowl 
The gorge is southeast of Kinuseo Falls and immediately south of the entrance road on the Stone Corral Interpretive Hiking Trail.

The Stone Corral
Identified in 1999, it comprises a crystal-clear doline surrounded by 100-metre vertical limestone cliffs. Immediately south of the Green Bowl, the four-kilometre interpretive trail also includes ponds, falls and caves that contain stalactites, moonsmilk and other limestone formations.

Monkman Lake Trail
The trail follows the east bank of the Murray River for seven kilometres before crossing a suspension bridge. About 10 km. farther are branches to the Cascades.

The Cascades
The Cascades are a series of 10 waterfalls along Monkman Creek including Lower Moore Falls, Upper Falls, Brooks Falls, Shire Falls, Monkman Falls, McGinnis Falls and Chambers Falls. Located about 4 km. before Monkman Lake, and 1 km. west of the Memorial Trail, four bear names of original highway trailblazers: Brooks, Moore, Monkman and McGinnis.

Monkman Lake
Located near the centre of the northern half of the park, the original 25-km. trail ended at the serene lake. Surrounded by precipitous mountains, it is the largest body of water in the park.

Monkman Pass Memorial Trail
Officially opened July 17, 2008, the route is an extension of the Monkman Lake Trail. The 63-km. hike takes five to six days to complete, and follows part of the former road/trail. South of Monkman Lake, the trail deviates from the original route into subalpine meadows with a series of tarns. Descending the western slopes, the terminus is Hobi’s Cabin, at the confluence of Fontiniko and Herrick Creeks, a destination accessible only by boat.

Footnotes

References
 
 
 
 
 
 
 
 http://pgnewspapers.pgpl.ca/fedora/repository

Further reading
Helm, Charles. Tumbler Ridge: Enjoying its History, Trails, and Wilderness  MCA Publishing (2001).

External links

 https://tumblerridge.ca/discover/id/39/monkman-provincial-park
 http://www.discoverthepeacecountry.com/htmlpages/monkmanparkbc.html Kinuseo Falls as featured on DiscoverThePeaceCountry.com
 http://southpeacearchives.org/monkman-pass-highway-association/ Monkman Pass Highway Association

Provincial parks of British Columbia
Parks in the Canadian Rockies
Northern Interior of British Columbia
Caves of British Columbia
1981 establishments in British Columbia
Protected areas established in 1981